Coleophora attalicella is a moth of the family Coleophoridae. It is found in the lower Volga region and Ural region of Russia and Afghanistan.

Adults are on wing in June.

References

attalicella
Moths described in 1871
Moths of Asia